The 2011 Green World ATP Challenger was a professional tennis tournament played on hard courts. It was the first edition of the tournament which was part of the 2011 ATP Challenger Tour. It took place in Pingguo, China between 21 and 27 March 2011.

ATP entrants

Seeds

Other entrants
The following players received wildcards into the singles main draw:
  Chang Yu
  Gong Maoxin
  Li Zhe
  Zhang Ze

The following players received entry from the qualifying draw:
  Jamie Baker
  Colin Fleming
  Jun Woong-sun
  Yang Tsung-hua

Champions

Singles

 Go Soeda def.  Matthias Bachinger, 6–4, 7–5

Doubles

 Mikhail Elgin /  Alexander Kudryavtsev def.  Harri Heliövaara /  Jose Rubin Statham, 6–3, 6–2

External links
ITF Search 
ATP official site

Green World ATP Challenger
Green World ATP Challenger
2011 in Chinese tennis